The 1955 Liège–Bastogne–Liège was the 41st edition of the Liège–Bastogne–Liège cycle race and was held on 1 May 1955. The race started and finished in Liège. The race was won by Stan Ockers.

General classification

References

1955
1955 in Belgian sport
1955 Challenge Desgrange-Colombo